Barceló Bávaro Grand Resort, also known as Barceló Bávaro or simply as Barceló (in the surrounding areas), is a luxury hotel and resort in Punta Cana in the municipality of Higüey, in La Altagracia Province on the east coast of the Dominican Republic, owned by Barceló Hotels and Resorts. Established in 1992 at a reported US$250 million, it is one of the biggest complexes in the country. Since 2012, the resort had been dramatically renovated for a reported US$330 million.

Features
Within the greater resort, there is the Barcelo Bavaro Palace Deluxe, which is family friendly. There is also the Barcelo Bavaro Beach, which is an adult only zone. Much of the interior is inspired by Danish design. As of 2010 it had 798 rooms, with outdoor patios and Jacuzzis. In 2020,  was certified for anti-COVID-19 measures.

Rooms 
There are a number of different room options. These include the Junior Suite, the Superior Room, the Junior Suite Premium Level, the Suite Premium Level, Panoramic Suite Premium Level, Master Suite Premium Level and the Presidential Suite Premium Level.

References

Bibliography

Hotels in the Dominican Republic
Hotels established in 1992
Hotel buildings completed in 1992